Theodore Roosevelt Lake (usually called Roosevelt Lake, sometimes Lake Roosevelt) is a large reservoir formed by Theodore Roosevelt Dam on the Salt River in Arizona as part of the Salt River Project (SRP). The reservoir and the masonry dam that created it, Roosevelt Dam, were both named after U.S. President Theodore Roosevelt who dedicated the dam himself in March 1911. Roosevelt Lake is a popular recreation destination within the Tonto National Forest; the facilities located at this lake are managed by that authority.

Roosevelt Lake is the oldest of the six reservoirs constructed and operated by the Salt River Project. It also has the largest storage capacity of the SRP lakes with the ability to store  of water when the conservation limit of Roosevelt Dam is reached. When the dam is in flood-control mode, the lake can store  of water; however, the U.S. Army Corps of Engineers requires all water over the conservation limit to be released from the lake within 20 days.

Geography

Roosevelt Lake is located in central Arizona almost entirely within Gila County although a small portion lies in Maricopa County. The lake covers much of the southern portion of the Tonto Basin, a low-lying area between the Sierra Ancha Mountains, Mazatzal Mountains (including Four Peaks), and the Superstition Mountains. State Route 188 travels along the shore of the lake for much of its length. Parts of the monument provide views of much of the reservoir.

Recreation and wildlife

Fishing is a common recreational activity at Roosevelt Lake. The lake is home to a variety of game fish including crappie, carp, sunfish, flathead and channel catfish, and smallmouth bass and largemouth bass. There was a slot size limit of between 13 and 16 inches for the bass, and only one can be taken per day.

Until recently, Lake Roosevelt also hosted the state's most significant population of the federally endangered southwestern willow flycatcher. Since the lake's rise following heavy rains in the winter of 2005, the population dynamics between this site and the other significant Arizona population (on the San Pedro River) are unclear.

There are several Arizona Trail trailheads in the vicinity.

The Lake is home to the Grapevine Airstrip, a small general aviation recreational airstrip located a quarter mile from the shore. The airstrip hosts numerous fly-ins a year.

References

References

External links

 Roosevelt Lake, AZ
 Roosevelt Lake Marina 
 Roosevelt Dam: Brief History
 Salt River Project:Roosevelt Dam
 Daily Water level Report from SRP
 Arizona Boating Locations Facilities Map
 Arizona Fishing Locations Map
 Video of Roosevelt Lake, Arizona
 Roosevelt Lake, AZ

Reservoirs in Gila County, Arizona
Superstition Mountains
Tonto National Forest
Reservoirs in Arizona
1911 establishments in Arizona Territory